Australia Calls is a 1923 Australian silent film directed by Raymond Longford commissioned by the Australian government to be shown at the British Empire Exhibition in Wembley Park, London, in 1924.

It was a semi-documentary about the adventures of Ernest Idiens, a labourer from  Longnor Staffordshire who moved to New South Wales with his brother in 1912 with only £30 between them and by 1923 had assets worth £14,000. In 1923 Idiens toured England talking about his success.

The movie is not to be confused with Longford's 1913 picture Australia Calls and is considered a lost film.

Production
The Australian government originally commissioned Longford to make four films depicting Australian society, each running 4,000 feet and costing £1,500. However bad weather caused a delay in shooting and Longford only made two, this and An Australian By Marriage. The other two movies were shot by the official government cinematographer, Bert Ive.

Shooting began in March 1923 in the country town of Harden, New South Wales and the film was completed by June, six weeks behind schedule. An Australian by Marriage was completed immediately afterwards but very little is known about it.

The other two films were completed by November, when they were all shown to leading members of the government.

Reception
The reviewer from The Register praised the film saying "Seldom has the screen given a more striking demonstration of its power to tell a convincing story."

Everyones said "The photography... is  exceptionally   good,   and   the   scenes  embodied   in   the   story   are   far   ahead of   anything   previously   seen.   The picture   should   have   been   made four   or   five   years   ago,   for   those exhibited   in   London   to   encourage immigration,   during   the   period  the   writer   \Vas   in   London,   were  a   disgrace   to   the   Commonwealth,  besides   being   very   misleading."

References

External links

1923 films
Australian drama films
Australian silent feature films
Australian black-and-white films
Films directed by Raymond Longford
Lost Australian films
1923 drama films
Lost drama films
1923 lost films
Silent drama films
British Empire Exhibition
World's fair films